{{DISPLAYTITLE:Theta2 Microscopii}}

Theta2 Microscopii (θ2 Mic) is a class A0III (white giant) star in the constellation Microscopium. Its apparent magnitude is 5.76 and it is approximately 390 light years away based on parallax.  It is an Ap star, a chemically peculiar star with unusually strong metallic spectral lines.

The main star is known to be a binary, with two components A (6.24 mag) and B (6.88 mag) orbiting with a semimajor axis of 0.836" and eccentricity 0.201, with a period 464.66 years. A more distant companion, C, has a separation around 78.4" and magnitude 10.3.

References

Microscopium
A-type giants
Microscopii, Theta2
Ap stars
CD-41 14503
8180
203585
105696
Multiple stars
Astrometric binaries